The Lamborghini Silhouette P300 is a two-door two-seat mid-engined rear-wheel drive sports car, that was made in small numbers by Lamborghini between 1976 and 1979.

Officially presented at the 1976 Geneva Auto Show, the Silhouette began as a styling exercise by noted Italian Carrozzeria Bertone.  It was based on the earlier Lamborghini Urraco, but was distinguished from the Urraco by more angular styling. The Silhouette was the first Lamborghini to employ a targa top roof. The Silhouette later evolved into the similar looking but more successful Lamborghini Jalpa. The car had a 3.0-litre all-aluminium alloy Lamborghini V8 engine mounted transversely behind the driver. Of the 54 units built (12 with right-hand drive), 31 are currently known to exist.

Official performance figures indicate the Silhouette could complete the  sprint in 6.5 seconds,  in 16.1 seconds, and could reach a top speed of

References

 

Silhouette
Cars introduced in 1976
Rear mid-engine, rear-wheel-drive vehicles

Bertone vehicles